Puya entre-riosensis is a species in the genus Puya. This species is endemic to Bolivia.

References

entre-riosensis
Flora of Bolivia